Oberwinterthur railway station is a railway station that serves Oberwinterthur, which is district number 2 in Winterthur, a city in the Canton of Zurich, Switzerland.

Opened in 1855, the station is of simple design, and is owned and operated by the Swiss Federal Railways.  It is served by four Zürich S-Bahn lines. As the terminus of three regional bus lines, it is also a transfer station for commuters.

North of the station, in Hegmatten, is the Zugunterhaltungsanlage Oberwinterthur. There, the double-decker Zürich S-Bahn trains, and the Stadler Flirt und GTW multiple unit trains, are maintained. A vehicle maintenance facility for other users is planned.

Location
Oberwinterthur railway station is situated right in the centre of Oberwinterthur.

Services

Zürich S-Bahn 
The station is served by the following four Zürich S-Bahn lines:

Night trains 
Oberwinterthur is served by one "Nightliner", operated by THURBO. The line to Stein am Rhein is served not by night trains, but by various night bus lines.

  Winterthur – Romanshorn ((– Konstanz (D)) – Kreuzlingen)

Local transport

Bahnhof Oberwinterthur bus station 
This is the actual bus station for the railway station, and is located on the same side of the tracks as the station building.

The first three bus lines serving this bus station are operated by the city network.  The other three are regional lines that terminate at Oberwinterthur railway station.  Of the regional lines, the yellow line 615 is operated by PostBus Switzerland, while the other two are operated by the city bus network.

Hegifeld bus station
The Hegifeld bus station is located on the side of the tracks opposite from the station building, but is nevertheless connected directly with the railway station and its platforms by a pedestrian underpass.

* Line 680 runs three times each day to Girenbad bei Turbenthal.

Night buses 

The night bus N65 (HB – Oberseen – Hegi – Elsau – Wiesendangen) also serves Hegifeld station, but only for alighting passengers.

See also 

History of rail transport in Switzerland
Rail transport in Switzerland

References

External links 
 
 SBB-CFF-FFS website (Swiss rail operator)

This article is based upon a translation of the German language version as at November 2011.

Railway stations in the canton of Zürich
Swiss Federal Railways stations
Transport in Winterthur
Railway stations in Switzerland opened in 1855